Bailival Castle may refer to:
 Baillival Castle (Bulle)
 Baillival Castle (Corbières)
 Baillival Castle (Surpierre)
 Baillival Castle (Vuippens)